The 1914–15 Sheffield Shield season was the 23rd season of the Sheffield Shield, the domestic first-class cricket competition of Australia. Victoria won the championship after being awarded the title with a better average.

Table

Statistics

Most Runs
Jack Ryder 425

Most Wickets
Bert Ironmonger 32

References

Sheffield Shield
Sheffield Shield
Sheffield Shield seasons